Modrovka is a village and municipality in Nové Mesto nad Váhom District in the Trenčín Region of western Slovakia.

History
In historical records the village was first mentioned in 1380.

Geography
The municipality lies at an altitude of 170 metres and covers an area of 3.160 km². It has a population of about 224 people.

References

External links

  Official page

Villages and municipalities in Nové Mesto nad Váhom District